Luciano Gualdi (born 30 January 1989) is an Italian professional footballer who plays as a midfielder for Serie D club Folgore Caratese.

Club career
Formed on AlbinoLeffe youth system, Gualdi made his senior debut for Colognese on Serie D. In 2010 he joined to Renate, played more than 100 matches for the club. For the 2014–15 season, he joined Ascoli.

In 2018, he joined Serie C club Pro Sesto. After four full seasons with the club, Gualdi initially stated his intention to retire from professional football, as he also became a free agent: however, in July 2022, he announced that he had changed his mind and wanted to keep playing.

References

External links
 
 

1989 births
Living people
Footballers from Bergamo
Italian footballers
Association football midfielders
Serie C players
Serie D players
U.C. AlbinoLeffe players
A.C. Renate players
Ascoli Calcio 1898 F.C. players
Venezia F.C. players
Alma Juventus Fano 1906 players
S.S.D. Acireale Calcio 1946 players
Pro Sesto 2013 players
U.S. Folgore Caratese A.S.D. players